Vicus Maracitanus was a civitas of the Roman Province of Roman North Africa   that has been identified with ruins at 36° 01′ 04″ N, 9° 13′ 47″ E the modern village of Ksar-Toual-Zouameul (just south of El Ksour) in Siliana province Tunisia.

The remains are scattered over an area of abpout 800m with a temple and Basilica still evident.
The Princeton encyclopedia of classical sites describes the town as:
The modest country town is unquestionably pre-Roman in origin. The chief monument, the Capitolium, which is in the form of a temple with a pronaos that was probably hexastyle, stood on the square of a forum opposite a larger building of unknown purpose. A section of a street, some cisterns, and what may have been a Christian chapel have been excavated.

The name has been confirmed from inscription in situ, prior to that it had been attributed by some to Zama Regia.

References

Roman towns and cities in Tunisia
Ancient Berber cities